Jor or JOR may refer to:

People 
 Finn Jor (born 1929), Norwegian journalist and writer
 Jorge Ben Jor (born 1945), Brazilian musician, singer and songwriter
 Jor (born in 1997),
American musician, singer and songwriter

Places 
 Jor (woreda), a woreda in the Gambela Region of Ethiopia
 Jor, Iran, a village in Sistan and Baluchesstan Province, Iran
 Jar, Iran, also spelled Jor, a village in Isfahan Province, Iran

Codes 
 JOR, MTR station code for Jordan station, Hong Kong
 JOR, National Rail station code for Jordanhill railway station, Glasgow, Scotland
 jor, ISO 639-3 code for the Jorá language, a Tupian language of Bolivia

Other uses 
 Jor (film), a 2008 Bengali film
 Jor (music), a formal section of composition in Indian music

See also
 Jor-El, fictional father of Superman